The Monmouth Cup Stakes is a Grade III American Thoroughbred horse race for three-years-old and older run over a distance of  miles annually in early July at Monmouth Park in Oceanport, New Jersey. The event currently offers a purse of $400,000 added.

History

The event was inaugurated as the Meadowlands Cup and held at the Meadowlands Racetrack on 29 October 1977 and was won by Pay Tribute who was trained by the Hall of Fame trainer Ron McAnally and ridden by Hall of Fame jockey Ángel Cordero Jr. by  lengths in a time of 2:02 over the  miles distance.

The event was the signature event at the Meadowlands track with its high stakes attracting class horses. Within two years when champion three-year-old Spectacular Bid won the event in stakes record time it was classed as Grade II. The event was upgraded to Grade I in 1983.

The event was decreased to its present  miles distance in 1990. That year's running posed one of the largest upsets in North American racing history when Great Normand won at 181-1 odds.

There was no race held in 1997 or 2011. The race was downgraded from a Grade II to a Grade III in 2017, and the purse was reduced to $100,000 from the previous $200,000.

The event was moved to Monmouth Park in 2010 and was renamed to the Monmouth Cup Stakes.

Sharp Azteca's win in 2017 set a track record at Monmouth for the distance of  miles, beating Formal Gold's 1:40.20 that was set in August 1997.

Records
Speed record:
 miles:  1:45.93 – Etched (2009)
 miles:  1:40.19 – Sharp Azteca  (2017)
 miles:  1:58.80  – Alysheba (1988)

Margins
 8 lengths – Marquetry (1993)
 lengths – Sharp Azteca  (2017)

Most wins:
 2 –  Etched  (2009, 2010)
 2 –  Bradester  (2015, 2016)

Most wins by a jockey:
 4 – Ángel Cordero Jr. (1977, 1978, 1983, 1986)
 4 – John R. Velazquez (1998, 2001, 2004, 2006)

Most wins by a trainer:
 4 – Todd A. Pletcher (2004, 2006, 2012, 2021)

Most wins by an owner:
 2 – Darley Stable (2009, 2010)
 2 – Joseph W. Sutton (2015, 2016)

Winners

Notes:

§ Ran as an entry

See also 
 List of American and Canadian Graded races

References

Graded stakes races in the United States
Open mile category horse races
Horse races in New Jersey
Recurring sporting events established in 1977
1977 establishments in New Jersey
Grade 3 stakes races in the United States
Monmouth Park Racetrack
Meadowlands Racetrack